The Animal or Animal is the nickname of:

The Animal 

 Joseph Barboza (1932–1976), Portuguese-American mafioso and mob hitman
 Dave Bautista (born 1969), American actor, mixed martial artist, and professional wrestler
 George Steele (1937-2017) professional wrestler
 Ellen van Dijk (born 1987), Dutch cyclist
 Brad Lesley (born 1958), American baseball player and television personality
 Mark Mendoza (born 1955), American bass player
 Anthony Parnes, English stockbroker convicted of trading fraud committed in the 1980s
 Michael Smith (basketball, born 1972), American National Basketball Association player

Animal 
 Clive Burgess (1950–2006), Welsh rugby union player
 Chris Carter (outfielder) (born 1982), American baseball player
 Edmundo (footballer) (born 1971), Brazilian footballer

See also 

 
 
 Alex González (musician) (born 1969), American drummer and songwriter for the Mexican band Maná nicknamed "El Animal"
 Pasquale Barra, former hitman for the Italian Camorra criminal organization nicknamed "o Nimale" ("The Animal")
 Jorge Costa (born 1971), Portuguese retired footballer nicknamed "Bicho" ("Animal")
 The Beast (nickname), a set index of people nicknamed "The Beast"

Lists of people by nickname